Sporyshevo is a rural locality (a village) in Mayskoye Rural Settlement, Vologodsky District, Vologda Oblast, Russia. The population was 2 as of 2002.

Geography 
Sporyshevo is located 14 km northwest of Vologda (the district's administrative centre) by road. Kovyliovo is the nearest village. creek Mesha[]

References 

Rural localities in Vologodsky District